

The Western Australian Centenary Air Race (also known as the East-West Air Race) was a  air race held in 1929 from Sydney to Perth to commemorate the centenary of Western Australia.

The £1000 handicap winner was Horrie Miller and the £300 fastest overall time prize was won by Briton Major Hereward de Havilland (22 hours 50 minutes 23 seconds), who flew the course solo, the only competitor to do so, in a modified de Havilland Gypsy Moth.

Determining results in the handicap event was found to be a difficult task, with type of machine, weather conditions, wind direction and strength of wind for each half day's hop, supplemented by times of starting being taken into consideration.

700 people had turned out at Kalgoorlie to see the competitors off on the final leg of the race. Weather conditions after leaving Tammin were said to be atrocious, with at least one forced landing and one crash.

The 17 teams left from Mascot in Sydney on 29 September 1929 and 14 managed to finish at Maylands Aerodrome on Sunday 7 October.

Fastest times
 H. de Havilland (22 hours 50 minutes 23 seconds)
 Heath (23.24.51)
 Miller (23.31.58)
 Cunningham (26.56.52)
 Pentland (27.14.44)
 Eaton (28.17.30)
 McKay (29.23.10)
 Bardsley (29.37.58)
 Davies (29.32.54)
 Manifold (30.31.58)
 Farmer (31.35.7)
 Knapman (32.4.49)
 Lee Murray (32.30.0)
 Penny (32.56.20)

See also
Silver Centenary

References

Further reading
Adelaide Observer, 28 September 1929, page 20d, 12 October 1929, pages 33 (photographs)-61.

Air races
Aviation in Western Australia
Centenary of Western Australia
1929 in Australian sport
Sports competitions in Western Australia
1929 in aviation